The Argyle Case is a lost 1917 American silent mystery film produced by and starring Robert Warwick and directed by Ralph Ince. It was distributed by Lewis J. Selznick through his Selznick Pictures Corporation.

The play was refilmed in 1929 as an early talkie The Argyle Case with Thomas Meighan and Lila Lee.

Cast
Robert Warwick as Asche Kayton
Charles Hines as Joe Manning
Frank McGlynn as John Argyle
Arthur Albertson as Bruce Argyle
Gazelle Marche as Nan Thornton
Elaine Hammerstein as Mary Mazuret
John Fleming as Inspector Dougherty
H. Cooper Cliffe as Frederick Kreisler
Mary Alden as Nellie Marsh
Robert Vivian as Finley
Frank Evans as Mr. Hurley

References

External links

1917 films
American silent feature films
Lost American films
Films directed by Ralph Ince
American films based on plays
American mystery films
American black-and-white films
1917 mystery films
Selznick Pictures films
1917 lost films
1910s American films
Silent mystery films